Luigi Miraglia (born 28 October 1965) (Latin: Aloisius Miraglia) is an Italian Latinist and classicist. He is a proponent of Hans Ørberg's natural method of language learning and the founder of the Accademia Vivarium Novum.

Biography
Miraglia is a grandson of the nineteenth century Italian jurist and politician Luigi Miraglia. Miraglia attended the Classical Lyceum Umberto I in Naples, afterwards studying at the University of Naples Federico II and University of Salerno. In 1989, he became the director of the journal Il trifoglio, and in 1989 became a didactic consultant at the European Language Institute in Recanati. Since 1996 he has been the director of the Accademia Vivarium Novum, first in Montella and, since 2009, in Rome. During the 2009–2010 academic year, he taught "Elements of Latin Conversation and Composition and Living Latinity" at the Pontificial Superior Institute for Latin (Latin: Pontificium Institutum Altioris Latinitatis), followed by courses on "Medieval Latin Literature" and "Internship to Classical Language Teachers". Since 2011, he has been a member of the Academia Latinitati Fovendae; since 2012, he has been a member of the Pontifical Academy for Latin.

References

1965 births
Italian Latinists
University of Naples Federico II alumni
University of Salerno alumni
Living people